USS APc-21 was a United States Navy  vessel in World War II. Laid down on 24 May 1942 as Coastal Minesweeper AMc-173 at Hodgdon Brothers, and Goudy and Stevens, East Boothbay, Maine, she was launched on 2 September 1942 and commissioned as APc-21 on 27 February 1943.

She sailed from Maine to Brisbane, Australia and served with the Seventh Fleet Amphibious Force in the South West Pacific Area conducting operations off the coast of New Guinea. She was participating in the landings during the battle of Arawe when struck by a bomb from an enemy air attack off Arawe, New Britain on 17 December 1943 and sank within four minutes.

Wreck location:

References

Bibliography
Online resources
 

 

1942 ships
World War II shipwrecks in the Pacific Ocean
APc-1-class small coastal transports
Ships sunk by Japanese aircraft
Maritime incidents in December 1943